William Ruggles MacKenzie (born September 28, 1974) is an American professional golfer who has played on the PGA Tour. MacKenzie was born and raised in Greenville, North Carolina.

After a semester at Lees-McRae College, Will took the money he earned washing dishes and selling grilled-cheese sandwiches at Grateful Dead concerts and moved out west.  After a while working for Taco Bell in Jackson Hole, Wyoming, he spent the next five winters snowboarding while living out of a van in Big Sky, Montana. At one point, he spent 30 days living in a snow cave near Valdez, Alaska without showering, and snowboarding the Chugach Mountains, before ending up with frostbite.

During the warmer months, he climbed rocks, and became a class V kayaker before working as a rafting guide in Montana and its Gallatin River, West Virginia and its Gauley River, and rivers around North Carolina.  He returned to Greenville, North Carolina in 1999, making enough money selling Christmas trees to embark on a three-month surfing trip to Costa Rica.  Unfortunately, when he returned home and tried to make a living selling hammocks, he ended up in huge debt.

However, a glimpse on television of his boyhood idol, Payne Stewart, winning the 1999 U.S. Open rekindled his love affair with the game, and he decided to play professionally. He turned pro in 2000.

MacKenzie played on several mini-tours shortly after turning pro. He played on the Golden Bear Tour in 2003 and finished ninth on the money list. The next year (2004), he played the Hooters Tour and finished third on the money list with three wins. He also played on the Nationwide and Canadian Tours.

2005 was his rookie season on the PGA Tour. His first win came in 2006 at the Reno-Tahoe Open in his 47th career start on the PGA Tour. He won the 2008 Viking Classic in a three-way playoff on the second hole over Marc Turnesa and Brian Gay.

In 2013, MacKenzie played the entire season on the Web.com Tour, finished 40th on the money list, and regained his PGA Tour privileges through the Web.com Tour Finals. In the 2014 PGA Tour, he finished second at the Valero Texas Open and fourth at the Valspar Championship.

MacKenzie currently resides in Jupiter, Florida.

Professional wins (2)

PGA Tour wins (2)

PGA Tour playoff record (1–1)

Playoff record
Web.com Tour playoff record (0–1)

Results in major championships

CUT = missed the half-way cut
"T" = tied

See also
2004 PGA Tour Qualifying School graduates
2005 PGA Tour Qualifying School graduates
2013 Web.com Tour Finals graduates
2016 Web.com Tour Finals graduates

References

External links

Outside Magazine profile

American male golfers
PGA Tour golfers
Korn Ferry Tour graduates
Golfers from North Carolina
Golfers from Florida
Sportspeople from Greenville, North Carolina
People from Jupiter, Florida
1974 births
Living people